Sir John Bowser (2 September 1856 – 10 June 1936), Australian politician, was the 26th Premier of Victoria. He was born in London, the son of an army officer, and arrived in Melbourne as a child with his family. He grew up at Bacchus Marsh and when he left school got a job with the Bacchus Marsh Express. As a young man he went to Scotland and worked on newspapers while studying at University of Edinburgh. Returning to Australia, he settled in Wangaratta, where he farmed and managed the Wangaratta Chronicle, which he eventually bought.

In October 1894, Bowser was elected to the Victorian Legislative Assembly for Wangaratta and Rutherglen. Wangaratta and Rutherglen was renamed to Electoral district of Wangaratta in 1906, and was renamed again to Electoral district of Wangaratta and Ovens in 1927. Bowser held the seat until November 1929. In total Bowser represented Wangaratta, in its different names, for 35 years. He was Minister for Public Instruction in the Liberal government of Thomas Bent in 1908–1909, but thereafter did not hold office again until he became Premier. He emerged as one of the leaders of the conservative rural faction of the Liberal Party, known as the Economy Party, concerned with getting roads and railways to their districts, cutting government expenditure, and keeping country areas over-represented in the Assembly.

In 1917, the Liberal Premier, Alexander Peacock, increased country rail fares, arguing that the Victorian Railways would otherwise become insolvent. In protest, Bowser led his faction into opposition, and at the election in November, Bowser's followers won 27 seats, to Labor's 18, the Peacock Liberals' 12 and the Victorian Farmers Union's four. Peacock resigned and Bowser became Premier. He rescinded Peacock's rail fares increases, but had no answer to the larger problem of railway finances. In May 1918, he was defeated in the Assembly when all the other parties voted against a railways estimates bill.

Bowser, who had little taste for office, immediately resigned, and a Peacock Liberal, Harry Lawson, formed a composite ministry of the various Liberal factions, with Bowser as Chief Secretary and Minister for Public Health, posts he held until 1919. In 1921, he joined the newly formed Country Party. In 1924, he was elected Speaker of the Victorian Legislative Assembly, which was becoming a traditional honour for former Premiers. He was knighted in 1927 and retired from politics in 1929.

In 1922, a railway station just north of Wangaratta was named after him.

References

Geoff Browne, A Biographical Register of the Victorian Parliament, 1900-84, Government Printer, Melbourne, 1985
Don Garden, Victoria: A History, Thomas Nelson, Melbourne, 1984
Kathleen Thompson and Geoffrey Serle, A Biographical Register of the Victorian Parliament, 1856-1900, Australian National University Press, Canberra, 1972
 Raymond Wright, A People's Counsel. A History of the Parliament of Victoria, 1856-1990, Oxford University Press, Melbourne, 1992
 

|-

|-

1856 births
1936 deaths
Premiers of Victoria
Victoria (Australia) state politicians
People from Bacchus Marsh
Alumni of the University of Edinburgh
Members of the Victorian Legislative Assembly
Speakers of the Victorian Legislative Assembly
Australian Knights Bachelor
Australian politicians awarded knighthoods
English emigrants to colonial Australia